Erymidae is a family of decapod crustaceans known only from fossils. They survived for 100 million years, from the Permo-Triassic boundary to the Albian. Eleven genera are recognised:

Clytiella Glaessner, 1931 – 1 species
Clytiopsis Bill, 1914 – 3 species
Enoploclytia M’Coy, 1849 – 20 species
Eryma Von Meyer, 1840 – 44 species
Galicia Garassino & Krobicki, 2002 – 3 species
Lissocardia Von Meyer, 1851 – 3 species
Palaeastacus Bell, 1850 – 24 species
Paraclytiopsis Oravec, 1962 – 1 species
Protoclytiopsis Birshtein, 1958 – 1 species
Pustulina Quenstedt, 1857 – 12 species
Stenodactylina Beurlen, 1928 – 1 species

References

Glypheidea
Prehistoric crustacean families
Triassic crustaceans
Jurassic crustaceans
Triassic first appearances
Early Cretaceous extinctions